Sluc may refer to:
SLUC, a Spanish software license
SLUC Nancy, a French basketball team
Sluč, a Belarusian river